Phen is a district (amphoe) in the northern part of Udon Thani province, Isan, Thailand.

Geography 
Neighboring districts are (from the northeast clockwise) Sang Khom, Ban Dung, Phibun Rak, Mueang Udon Thani, Ban Phue of Udon Thani Province, Sakhrai, Mueang Nong Khai and Phon Phisai of Nong Khai province.

History 
The district dates back to Mueang Phen, which was a subordinate of Mueang Nong Khai. In 1907 it became a district, then named Mueang Phen (เมืองเพ็ญ) in Udon Thani Province. In 1917 it was renamed Phen.

Administration 
The district is divided into 11 sub-districts (tambons), which are further divided into 151 villages (mubans). Phen is a township (thesaban tambon) which covers parts of the tambon Phen. There are a further 11 tambon administrative organizations (TAO).

References 

Phen